Manzur ( Manẓūr; also spelled Manzoor or Manzour) is a male Arabic name meaning "approved" or "accepted."  It is most commonly used in South and Southeast Asia.  Manzur is also a Spanish surname.

Notable people named Manzur or similar include
 Manzoor Ahmad, a Pakistani philosopher and scholar
 Manzoor Alam Beg, a Bangladeshi photographer
 Manzoor Hussain (field hockey) Jnr, a Pakistani field hockey player
 Manzoor Hussain Atif, a Pakistani field hockey player and sports administrator
 Manzoor Pashteen, a Pashtun human rights activist
 Manzoor Wattoo, a Pakistani politician
 Manzur Nu'mani, an Indian religious scholar
 Manzur Qadir, a Pakistani jurist and politician

People using it in their patronymic or as a surname include

 Abul Manzoor, a Bangladeshi army officer responsible for the assassination of Ziaur Rahman, the president of Bangladesh
 Hafiz Liaqat Manzoor, a Pakistani held in detention in the United States' Guantanamo Bay detention camps
 Ibn Manzur, an Arabic lexicographer
 Juan Luis Manzur, an Argentine politician
 Kazeem Manzur, a British racecar driver
 Mokbula Manzoor, a Bangladeshi writer
 Mustaqim Manzur, a Singaporean footballer
 Sarfraz Manzoor, a British writer and broadcaster
 Zahida Manzoor, an English businesswoman and civil servant

Music

 A type of tar with a specific, pointed body shape and often a wooden soundboard instead of skin.

See also
 Manzoor Colony, a neighbourhood of Jamshed Town, Karachi, Pakistan
 Mansur, a similar Arabic name

Arabic-language surnames
Arabic masculine given names